MDISC can refer to
M-DISC, an optical media technology
McDonnell Douglas Information Systems Company (MDISC), former owner of the Tymnet network